The RACV Royal Pines Resort is located in Benowa, City of Gold Coast, Queensland, Australia.  It is the host of the Australian PGA Championship and the Australian Ladies Masters. The resort contains a triangular tower hotel, conference center and a 27 hole golf course. It is the former host of the Mondial Australian Women's Hardcourts on the WTA Tour, which is now the Brisbane International in Brisbane, Australia.

Development 
The Royal Pines Gold Coast Resort and conference center was designed by Edward Larrabee Barnes and John M.Y. Lee Architects and finished in 1991. The developers were MID (Matsushita Investment and Development Company) It is currently owned by the RACV Resorts Division (Royal Automobile Club of Victoria).

The golf course was designed by Tomojiro Maruyama, a Japanese Golfer and Course Architect.

References 

Golf clubs and courses in Queensland
Buildings and structures on the Gold Coast, Queensland
1991 establishments in Australia
Sports venues on the Gold Coast, Queensland
Organisations based in Australia with royal patronage
Royal golf clubs